The Hoyoux is a river of Belgium, a right tributary of the Meuse. It flows for  through the province of Liège in the northern-central part of the country. It flows into the Meuse in Huy.

Rivers of Belgium
Rivers of Liège Province
Huy